René Arpin (born 7 July 1943) is a French biathlete. He competed at the 1972 Winter Olympics and the 1976 Winter Olympics.

References

External links
 

1943 births
Living people
French male biathletes
Olympic biathletes of France
Biathletes at the 1972 Winter Olympics
Biathletes at the 1976 Winter Olympics
Place of birth missing (living people)